The Ohio Valley Athletic Conference is a high school sports league in parts of southeastern Ohio and northern West Virginia.  The OVAC is the largest conference of its kind in the United States. Schools in the upper Ohio Valley supply over 18,000 athletes in various competitive athletic areas.  The conference was organized in 1943.

Classification
Schools are categorized by enrollment of eligible athletes, where Class A is the smallest enrollment and Class AAAAA is the largest enrollment. As of the 2020-2021 school year, there are 18,332 eligible athletes in grades 9 through 11.

Member schools

Conference affiliations

 Buckeye 8 Athletic League -  Beaver Local, Bellaire, Cambridge, East Liverpool, Edison, Harrison Central, Indian Creek, Martins Ferry, St. Clairsville, Union Local
 East Central Ohio League - Dover, New Philadelphia, Warren
 Eastern Ohio Athletic Conference - Southern Local, Wellsville
 Mason Dixon Conference - Cameron, Clay-Battelle, Hundred, Weirton Madonna
 Pioneer Valley Conference - Buckeye Trail, Caldwell, Fort Frye, Frontier, Monroe Central, Shenandoah
 Two Rivers Athletic Conference -  John Marshall, Morgantown, Parkersburg South, University, Wheeling Park

References

External links
 OVAC website

Ohio high school sports conferences